Nee Thodu Kavali is a 2002 Telugu romantic drama directed and produced by Bhimaneni Srinivasa Rao under Sampada Creation. Deepak, Charmi (in her film debut) and Rimi Sen played the lead roles.

Cast
 Deepak  as Vaasu
 Charmi as Manasa
 Rimi Sen as Sindhu
 Anuradha Pradhan
 Ramaprabha
 Jahnavi
 Vizag Prasad
 Radhaiah
 Deep Singh
 Gautham Raju
 Chitram Seenu
 Vinay Varma
 Baby Hasna

Soundtrack
The songs are composed by Valisha Baabji and Sandeep.

References

External links

2002 films
2000s Telugu-language films
Films directed by Bhimaneni Srinivasa Rao